Akentyev or Akentiev is a Russian masculine surname, its feminine counterpart is Akentyeva or Akentieva. Notable people with the surname include:

Anatoly Akentyev (born 1939), Russian cross-country skier

See also
Aksentyev

Russian-language surnames